Felix Brückmann (born December 16, 1990) is a German professional ice hockey goaltender.

Playing career
He is currently playing with Adler Mannheim of the Deutsche Eishockey Liga (DEL). He made his professional debut with Adler Mannheim before moving as a free agent to Grizzlys Wolfsburg on April 17, 2014.

After six seasons in Wolfsburg, Brückmann returned to original club, Adler Mannheim, on a two-year contract on 20 March 2020.

Career statistics

International

References

External links

1990 births
Living people
People from Breisach
Sportspeople from Freiburg (region)
Adler Mannheim players
German ice hockey goaltenders
Grizzlys Wolfsburg players
Heilbronner Falken players
Ice hockey players at the 2022 Winter Olympics
Olympic ice hockey players of Germany